The discography for American jazz singer Sammy Davis Jr.

Davis recorded extensively throughout his career and most recordings remain in the catalogs as various reissues. The following is a selected list of albums in chronological order by date of release.

Albums

Decca Records
1955 Starring Sammy Davis Jr.
1955 Just for Lovers
1956 Mr. Wonderful
1956 Here's Lookin' at You
1957 Sammy Swings
1957 It's All Over but the Swingin'
1957 Boy Meets Girl (with Carmen McRae)
1958 Mood to Be Wooed
1958 All The Way... and Then Some!
1959 Sammy Davis, Jr. at Town Hall
1959 Porgy and Bess (with Carmen McRae)
1960 Sammy Awards
1960 I Gotta Right to Swing
1961 Mr. Entertainment
1963 Forget-Me-Nots for First Nighters

Reprise Records
1961 The Wham of Sam
1961 As Long as She Needs Me
1962 Sammy Davis Jr. Belts the Best of Broadway
1962 The Sammy Davis Jr. All-Star Spectacular
1962 What Kind of Fool Am I and Other Show-Stoppers
1963 Sammy Davis Jr. at the Cocoanut Grove (live)
1964 Sammy Davis Jr. Salutes the Stars of the London Palladium
1964 The Shelter of Your Arms
1964 Sammy Davis Jr. Sings Mel Tormé's "California Suite"
1964 Sammy Davis Jr. Sings the Big Ones for Young Lovers
1965 When the Feeling Hits You! (with Sam Butera and the Witnesses)
1965 If I Ruled the World
1965 The Nat King Cole Songbook
1965 Sammy's Back on Broadway
1966 The Sammy Davis Jr. Show
1966 The Sounds of '66 (live, with Buddy Rich)
1966 Sammy Davis, Jr. Sings and Laurindo Almeida Plays (with Laurindo Almeida)
1967 That's All! (live)
1967 Sammy Davis, Jr. Sings the Complete 'Dr. Dolittle'
1968 Sammy Davis Jr.
1968 Lonely Is the Name
1968 I've Gotta Be Me
1969 The Goin's Great
1970 Sammy Steps Out

Verve Records
1965 Our Shining Hour (with The Count Basie Orchestra)

Motown Records
1970 Something for Everyone
1984 Hello Detroit (12 Inch Single)

MGM Records
1972 Sammy Davis Jr. Now
1972 Portrait of Sammy Davis Jr.
1973 It's A Musical World
1974 I'm Not Anyone, Single
1974 That's Entertainment!
1975 Sammy
1978 Stop The World I Want To Get off
1979 Hearin' Is Believin'

20th Century Records
1976 The Song and Dance Man
1977 Sings The Great TV Tunes

Applause Records
 1982 Closest of Friends

Guest appearances
With Lena Horne
"I Wish I'd Met You" on The Men in My Life (1988, Three Cherries Records)

With various artists
Reprise Musical Repertory Theatre (1963, Reprise)
"The Great Come-and-Get It Day" - Finian's Rainbow
"We Open in Venice", "Too Darn Hot" - Kiss Me Kate
"There Is Nothing Like a Dame", "You've Got to Be Carefully Taught" - South Pacific
"Sit Down, You're Rockin' the Boat" - Guys and Dolls

Singles

References

Discography
Vocal jazz discographies
Discographies of American artists